The 2021 Pensacola 200 was a ARCA Menards Series East race held on February 27, 2021, at the Five Flags Speedway. It was contested over 200 laps on the  short track. It was the second race of the 2021 ARCA Menards Series East season. Joe Gibbs Racing driver Sammy Smith collected his first career win in the ARCA Menards Series East.

Background

Entry list 

 (R) denotes rookie driver.
 (i) denotes driver who is ineligible for series driver points.

Practice/Qualifying 
Practice was delayed due to rain, leading to the combination of the practice and qualifying sessions. Sammy Smith posted the fastest lap in practice, with a time of 17.493 seconds and a speed of  gave him the pole award.

Starting Lineups

Race

Race results

References 

2021 in sports in Florida
Pensacola 200
2021 ARCA Menards Series East